Nathan Hall may refer to:

 Nathan K. Hall (1810–1874), American politician
 Nathan Hall (football coach) (born 1985), Australian footballer and coach